The Delivery Boy is a 1931 American animated short film directed by Burt Gillett, produced by Walt Disney Productions and distributed by Columbia Pictures. Being part of the Mickey Mouse film series, it was the twenty-ninth Mickey Mouse short to be produced, and the fifth of 1931.

Plot
Mickey Mouse is driving a rickety donkey cart piled high with musical instruments, with his dog Pluto running alongside. They stop when they reach Minnie's house, and spy on her while she is washing and hanging up clothes. She is singing "In the Shade of the Old Apple Tree", and her enthusiasm is so infectious that even the laundry is dancing along. Mickey mischievously hides in a large pair of bloomers hanging on the line, teasing her by singing along and twanging her tail. Catching on to his trick, she drops him into the washtub, which breaks.

That puts a stop to Minnie's laundry chores, so the mice break into a jazzy Charleston dance number. Excited by the dance, Mickey punches a hornet's nest off a branch, and it lands on the donkey's tail. In his panic, the donkey smashes the cart to pieces, and the musical instruments land all over the barnyard.

Undaunted by this disaster, Minnie asks Mickey to play the piano for her, and they break into a spirited duet of "The Stars and Stripes Forever". The animals all play along, and everything is jolly until Pluto investigates a nearby road crew's work, and picks up a lit stick of dynamite. Thinking that he is fetching a stick, Pluto brings the dynamite back to Mickey and Minnie, and it blows the mice into the sky. Even that fails to dampen their spirits, and they conclude the number with a flourish.

Production
The Charleston sequence was animated by Dick Lundy, the studio's dance specialist.

Peg-leg Pete makes a brief cameo, as one of the road crew.

Reception
In Mickey's Movies: The Theatrical Films of Mickey Mouse, Gijs Grob writes: "This short is as joyous as it is boring. After three years of song-and-dance routines, one grows tired of it. Morever, cartoons like Traffic Troubles and The Moose Hunt had proven that Mickey could do very well without them... Pluto's storyline, however brief, is the most interesting aspect of the cartoon, as it contains the germinal idea of a grand finale. Indeed, Pluto would cause havoc again in subsequent films, like Mickey Steps Out (1931), Mickey Cuts Up (1931), and The Grocery Boy (1932). In these films the song-and-dance routine would give way to well-built gag-filled finales, of which the one in The Delivery Boy is only an embryonic version."

Voice cast
 Mickey Mouse: Walt Disney
 Minnie Mouse: Marcellite Garner
 Pluto: Pinto Colvig

Home media
The short was released on December 7, 2004 on Walt Disney Treasures: Mickey Mouse in Black and White, Volume Two: 1929-1935., in the "From The Vault" bonus section.

Television
It was included in the TV show The Mickey Mouse Club (Season 1, Episode 33).

See also
Mickey Mouse (film series)

References

External links
 
 

Mickey Mouse short films
1930s Disney animated short films
1931 short films
American black-and-white films
1931 animated films
1931 films
Films produced by Walt Disney
American comedy films
Columbia Pictures short films
Columbia Pictures animated short films
Films directed by Burt Gillett
1930s English-language films
1930s American films